A court of the clerk of the market was an inferior court held at every market for the punishment of minor crimes, and to exercise control over market prices and over weights and measures. These courts were presided over by the relevant clerk of the market.

It was listed by Edward Coke in Institutes of the Lawes of England as a type of public court of criminal jurisdiction, and also included by William Blackstone in his Commentaries on the Laws of England:

References

Former courts and tribunals in England and Wales
Medieval English court system